Maple Valley is a city in King County, Washington, United States. The population was 28,013 at the 2020 census.  The city functions as a commuter town for residents, though there is an increasing amount of commercial activity in the area.

History
The area was settled in 1879 by three men who were improving a trail and brought their families in. When a name for a future community was proposed, the names Vine Maple Valley and Maple Ridge were suggested. A vote was taken by writing the names on slips of paper and placing them in a hat. Vine Maple Valley won by 2/3, but the word "Vine" was later cut by the post office because it made the name too long.

The town's early history mainly had to do with coal, lumber milling to build homes, and a railroad that ran through town. Coal was brought in from Black Diamond to the south, but the town itself also mined coal from Cedar Mountain. The mine was used as late as 1947.
Rail workers for lines like the Northern Pacific Railroad and the Cedar River Watershed, closed off by the City of Seattle, meant more workers for those things. More residents meant more lumber milling. More lumber milling meant more workers. Suquamish tribe chairperson Martha George was born near Maple Valley in Sheridan in 1892, at a logging camp where her mother and grandmother worked as cooks.

The town grew inward. Blacksmith shops, hotels, saloons and stores took up the town in the 1910s and 1920s. Schools went up as well. Early schools were shacks at best. A two-room school went up in 1910, and a larger high school was built in 1929 as the first school in the Tahoma School District. The school, after extensive renovations, still stands today as an elementary school. Much of this early development actually did not take place in the modern-day city, but rather in Hobart, northeast of incorporated Maple Valley.

More residents meant farming and fishing became staples in the area, with milk, poultry and berry farming becoming the main grown food staples in the area. Fishing out of the Cedar River also became popular. Maple Valley also saw resorts beginning in the 1920s. Lake Wilderness, once the site of a county lumber mill, quickly became a resort lake with the opening of Gaffney's Grove, which opened with a ballroom, restaurant and roller rink. Later, the resort grew to include an airstrip, lodge, rental cabins, a nine-hole golf course and a bowling alley. It remained in operation until 1964.

Increasing automobile use in the area gave rise to new roads being built. In the early 1960s, the construction of State Route 18 between Auburn and North Bend ran through the city, requiring many landmarks to be either demolished or moved. The Maple Valley Historical Society keeps records on the city's past, with two historical museums holding artifacts such as the city's first fire engine and photographs of old places in and around the city like Gaffney's Grove.

Incorporation and recent development
The city of Maple Valley was officially incorporated on August 31, 1997. The Green to Cedar River trail runs through the city, along SR 169 and Witte Road while passing through the former Gaffney's Grove site, now the Lake Wilderness City Park. The park includes a swimming beach and sprawling grass fields, and sees the annual Maple Valley Days Parade each year in June. The Lake Wilderness Arboretum is also located here.

Due to the urban growth boundaries of King County, the city is uniquely split into different sectors along Maple Valley Black Diamond Road (SR 169), the main thoroughfare through the city. At the northern and southern boundaries of the city lie two large commercial areas, while central Maple Valley is predominantly residential.

The south side's Four Corners district is the main commercial area of the city. It is located along Maple Valley Black Diamond Road and is bisected by Kent Kangley Road (SR 516) to create four distinct areas of development. The northwestern corner underwent massive reconstruction in the early 2010s and now features several large retailers, apartments, and a strip mall. The northeastern corner was completely constructed in the 2010s; it formerly was a large lumberyard and is now home to several retailers. The southern corners feature strip malls, retailers, an apartment complex, and a housing development.

Geography
Maple Valley is located at  (47.366160, -122.044692).

The main bodies of water in the city limits are Lake Wilderness, Lake Lucerne, Rock Creek, and part of Pipe Lake. The Cedar River passes through unincorporated King County very near the northeastern border of the city. The city is bordered by Hobart, Fairwood, and Ravensdale, two unincorporated King County census-designated places, along with the cities of Covington, Renton, Kent, and Black Diamond.

Climate

Maple Valley's climate is classified under the Köppen system as  mediterranean or maritime. It generally has cooler nights and more precipitation than Seattle year round. Winter days are also slightly colder than areas closer to downtown Seattle.

Demographics

Based on per capita income, one of the more reliable measures of affluence, Maple Valley ranks 93rd of 522 areas in the state of Washington to be ranked.

2010 census
As of the census of 2010, there were 22,684 people, 7,679 households, and 6,159 families residing in the city. The racial makeup of the city was 85.8% White, 2.1% African American, 0.5% Native American, 4.5% Asian, 0.4% Pacific Islander, 1.7% from other races, and 5.0% from two or more races. Hispanic or Latino of any race were 5.7% of the population.

There were 7,679 households, of which 49.9% had children under the age of 18 living with them, 67.1% were married couples living together, 9.2% had a female householder with no husband present, 3.9% had a male householder with no wife present, and 19.8% were non-families. 15.0% of all households were made up of individuals, and 5% had someone living alone who was 65 years of age or older. The average household size was 2.95 and the average family size was 3.30.

The median age in the city was 34.2 years. 32.3% of residents were under the age of 18; 5.9% were between the ages of 18 and 24; 31.8% were from 25 to 44; 23.3% were from 45 to 64; and 6.6% were 65 years of age or older. The gender makeup of the city was 49.4% male and 50.6% female.

2000 census
As of the census of 2000, there were 14,209 people, 4,809 households, and 3,952 families residing in the city. The population density was 2,617.9 inhabitants per square mile (1,010.3/km2). There were 4,922 housing units at an average density of 350.0 units/km2 (906.8 units/mi2). The ethnic makeup of the city was 90.62% White, 1.11% African American, 0.66% Native American, 2.46% Asian, 0.15% Pacific Islander, 1.36% from other races, and 3.64% from two or more ethnic groups. Hispanic or Latino of any ethnic group were 3.56% of the population.

There were 4,809 households, out of which 51.7% had children under the age of 18 living with them, 69.9% were married couples living together, 8.9% had a female householder with no husband present, and 17.8% were non-families. 13.6% of all households were made up of individuals, and 3.2% had someone living alone who was 65 years of age or older. The average household size was 2.95 and the average family size was 3.26.

In the city, the population was spread out, with 33.8% under the age of 18, 5.4% between 19 and 24, 38.5% between 25 and 44, 17.8% between 45 and 64, and 4.5% who were 65 years of age or older. The median age was 32 years. For every 100 females, there were 99.2 males. For every 100 females age 18 and over, there were 96.5 males.

The median income for a household in the city was $67,159, and the median income for a family was $70,008. Males had a median income of $50,623 versus $34,097 for females. The per capita income for the city was $24,859. About 2.1% of families and 2.6% of the population were below the poverty line, including 2.4% of those under age 18 and 3.7% of those age 65 and over.

Education
The entirety of Maple Valley is served by the Tahoma School District. There is one high school, two middle schools, and six elementary schools. The district operates its transportation facility adjacent to SR 18 on Petrovitsky near the city limits. The Central Services building is located next to Rock Creek Elementary School.

The Tahoma School District at one point had its high school in neighboring Covington. In 2015, a bond measure was passed to build a new and more centralized high school for the district. It was to be built in a small unincorporated area southeast of Four Corners that was completely surrounded by Maple Valley, known informally as the ‘Donut Hole’. The area was annexed into Maple Valley and the new three-story Tahoma High School was completed in 2017.

Most of the district's schools are located within the city, with a few exceptions:
 Tahoma High School (Maple Valley)
 Maple View Middle School (Covington)
 Summit Trail Middle School (Ravensdale)
 Glacier Park Elementary School (Maple Valley)
 Rock Creek Elementary School (Maple Valley)
 Shadow Lake Elementary School (Maple Valley)
 Cedar River Elementary School (Maple Valley)
 Lake Wilderness Elementary School (Maple Valley)
 Tahoma Elementary School (Hobart)

Government and politics

Maple Valley City Council
The City Council is made up of seven councillors elected by local residents.

According to the city's website, "the Council establishes policy direction for the City, enacts ordinances and resolutions, maintains relationships and contact in local, state, regional and national associations, and generally provides leadership for the City and direction to the City Manager."

Police
Maple Valley is a contract city with the King County Sheriff's Office for police services. The King County deputies that are assigned to the city wear city uniforms and patches, but wear a King County Sheriff badge. The deputies mostly drive marked patrol cars with the city logo.

Points of interest
 Cedar River
 Cedar River Trail
 Lake Wilderness
 Lake Wilderness Lodge
 Lake Wilderness Arboretum
 Walsh Lake

Notable people
 Brandi Carlile, singer-songwriter
 Zan Fiskum, singer and reality show competitor
 Omare Lowe, former NFL player
 Jens Pulver, Tahoma graduate and UFC fighter, UFC Hall of Fame and coach
 Richard Sherman, NFL cornerback formerly of the Seattle Seahawks, San Francisco 49ers, and Tampa Bay Buccaneers
 Johnny Valentine, 2006 inductee in the Professional Wrestling Hall of Fame

References

External links

City of Maple Valley
History of Maple Valley

Cities in King County, Washington
Cities in the Seattle metropolitan area
1997 establishments in Washington (state)
Cities in Washington (state)